Zikode is a surname. Notable people with the surname include:

Christopher Mhlengwa Zikode (born 1975), South African rapist and serial killer
Nomcebo Zikode (born 1988), South African singer and songwriter
S'bu Zikode (born 1975), South African activist

Surnames of African origin